Flamberge (also Floberge, Froberge, and other variations) is a medieval sword. Swung by a number of heroes of chansons de geste and romances, the name became a generic name for a large sword.

In earlier texts, the name is usually given as "floberge" or "froberge", but the name developed under the influence of the word "flamber". Swords by that name are wielded by Renaud de Montauban (and his cousin Maugris) in The Four Sons of Aymon (12th c.); Antenor in the Roman de Troie (12th c.); Begon, the brother of the eponymous hero of Garin le Loherain (12th c.); and the hero of Galien le Restoré (15th c.).

In early 20th-c works, swords of the name were wielded by Dom Manuel of James Branch Cabell's Biography of the Life of Manuel and by Prince Valiant.

References 

European swords